Ronald John (Ron) Woodley (born Edmonton, London 28 December 1925 - 25 February 2017) was Archdeacon of Cleveland from 1985  to 1991.

Woodley was educated at St Augustine's College, Canterbury and Bishops' College, Cheshunt. He was ordained Deacon in 1953, and Priest in 1954. After curacies in Middlesbrough and Whitby  he was Vicar of The Ascension, Middlesbrough from 1966 to 1971; then Rector of Stokesley from 1971 to 1985. He was Canon of York from 1982 to 2000.

References

1925 births
Alumni of Bishops' College, Cheshunt
Alumni of St Augustine's College, Canterbury
Archdeacons of Cleveland
2017 deaths
People educated at Marlborough College
People from Edmonton, London